The monastery of St. John the Baptist is located near the Jašunja village in the municipality of Leskovac, Serbia. It was founded in 1517 on the site of a temple from the time of Nemanjić dynasty, and since 1986 it represents an immovable cultural asset as a cultural monument of great importance.

History 
The church dedicated to Saint John the Baptist was built by Andronic Cantakouzin with the brothers, on the site of the older monastery. The Cantakouzin family was closely related to the last descendants of the despotic Branković line. The church has a single nave, with semi-shaped vaults and a porch on the west side. The temple is completely painted, and the oldest frescoes were painted in 1524 thanks to a certain Peter from Sofia. These frescoes are located in the nave. The frescoes in the middle zone of the narthex were painted later, around 1584, when the western facade was also painted.
The monastery was damaged several times by the Turks, so it was often restored and rebuilt. The monastery church was rebuilt in 1693, when the roof structure was rebuilt and changed. Then a new painting was painted, which completely covered the old one, and the founders of the painting were Roman and Pop Živko. The monastery was badly damaged during the First and Second Serbian Uprisings, but was soon restored. The last works on the frescoes were carried out in 1902 by the fresco painter from Veles, Jakov, with the help of his son Djordje, keeping the original layout of the compositions. Archaeological, architectural and picturesque conservation works were carried out in the period from 1986 to 1987.

After the October Revolution, in the twenties of the 20th century, Russian monks settled in the monastery, when the material and spiritual renovation of this sanctuary began. After the Second World War, with the arrival of the new government, in 1952, all the property of the monastery was confiscated.

References

Serbian Orthodox monasteries in Serbia
Medieval sites in Serbia
Medieval Serbian Orthodox monasteries
Christian monasteries established in the 16th century